Juncus effusus, with the common names common rush or soft rush, is a perennial herbaceous flowering plant species in the rush family Juncaceae. In North America, the common name soft rush also refers to Juncus interior.

Distribution
Juncus effusus is nearly cosmopolitan, considered native in Europe, Asia, Africa, North America, and South America. It has naturalized in Australia, Madagascar, and various oceanic islands.

It is found growing in wet areas, such as wetlands, riparian areas, and marshes. In the United Kingdom it is found in purple moor-grass and rush pastures and fen-meadow plant associations.

Description
It is commonly found growing in humus-rich areas like marshes, ditches, fens, and beaver dams.

The stems are smooth cylinders with light pith filling. In fact the stem ends there; the top part is the bract, that continues with only a slight colour-band marking it from the stem. The lower leaves are reduced to a brown sheath at the bottom of the stem.

Subspecies
Five subspecies are currently recognized:
Juncus effusus subsp. austrocalifornicus Lint — endemic to California and Baja California.
Juncus effusus subsp. effusus — widespread
Juncus effusus subsp. laxus (Robyns & Tournay) Snogerup — tropical Africa, Madagascar, Mauritius, Canary Islands, Madeira.
Juncus effusus subsp. pacificus (Fernald & Wiegand) Piper & Beattie — Alaska, British Columbia, Washington, Idaho, Oregon, California, Baja California.
Juncus effusus subsp. solutus (Fernald & Wiegand) Hämet-Ahti — central and eastern United States.

Juncus  effusus can be differentiated from the rarer Juncus pylaei by the number of ridges on the stem. Juncus effusus has 30 to 40 ridges and J. pylaei has 10 to 20.

Uses

Wildlife

The species provides wildfowl, wader feeding, and nesting habitats, and also habitats for small mammals. The rootstalks are eaten by muskrats, and birds take shelter amongst the plant's stems. A number of invertebrates feed on soft rush, including the rufous minor moth.

Humans
Juncus effusus is one of the seven ingredients of hui sup tea (去濕茶). In Japan, this rush is called  (藺草) and is grown to be woven into the covering of tatami mats (the filling is rice straw, extruded styrofoam, chip board, or some combination). In Iran and Afghanistan too it is used to weave light cheap mats.  It is called halfa (حلفا) and has medicinal uses too. In Europe, this rush was once used to make rushlights (by soaking the pith in grease), a cheap alternative to candles.

Cultivation
The species is cultivated as an ornamental plant, for planting in water gardens, native plant and wildlife gardens, and for larger designed natural landscaping and habitat restoration projects.

The cultivar Juncus effusus 'Spiralis' (syn. Juncus spiralis), with the common names corkscrew rush or spiral rush, is a distinctive potted and water garden plant due to its very curled spiral like foliage.

Weed control
Juncus effusus can become a naturalized or invasive species, undesirable in rangelands for its unpalatability to livestock. Suggested methods of controlling rushes include: ploughing; high applications of inorganic fertilizer (can pollute watersheds); and topping to prevent seed formation.

Chemistry
Juncusol is a 9,10-dihydrophenanthrene found in J. effusus. The plant also contains effusol and dehydroeffusol.

References

External links

Calflora Database: Juncus effusus (Bog rush,  Common bog rush, Common rush)
Jepson Manual eFlora (TJM2) treatment of Juncus effusus
University of Michigan - Dearborn:  Native American Ethnobotany of Juncus effusus
UC CalPhotos gallery of Juncus effusus
Radoslaw Walkowiak: Short Note of Juncus effusus ssp. effusus (CTC PAPER 2020)

effusus
Flora of Africa
Flora of Europe
Flora of North America
Flora of South America
Flora of temperate Asia
Freshwater plants
Garden plants
Medicinal plants
Plants used in traditional Native American medicine
Plants described in 1753
Taxa named by Carl Linnaeus